Roppeviller (Lorraine Franconian: Roppwiller) is a commune in the Moselle department of the Grand Est administrative region in north-eastern France.

The village belongs to the Pays de Bitche and to the Northern Vosges Regional Nature Park.

A path from the village runs up to the Altschlossfelsen rocks, a popular walking destination, on the hill of Brechenberg on the German side of the border.

See also
 Communes of the Moselle department

References

External links
 

Communes of Moselle (department)